Leucophasma is a genus of moths belonging to the family Tineidae.

Species
Leucophasma carmodiella Busck, 1910
Leucophasma phantasmella Walsingham, 1897

References

Tineidae
Tineidae genera